Spotted pine sawyer is a common name for several insects and may refer to:

Monochamus clamator
Monochamus maculosus

See also
Monochamus scutellatus, the white-spotted pine sawyer

Insect common names